Lickey End is a village in the Bromsgrove district of Worcestershire, England. It is situated just north of Bromsgrove, to the south-east of the junction of the A38 Birmingham Road and the M42 motorway, and has a population of 2,764. The Old Birmingham Road goes north out of the village, passing through Marlbrook before ending up at the village of Lickey. Lickey End developed during the early 1990s with  the addition of a large modern housing estate. The Parish Council that was created in 2001 was abolished following a ten-year campaign, with effect from 31 December 2010 according to the Lickey End Parish Council Dissolution/Abolition Order of 17 December 2010.

References

External links
 Lickey End parish council

Villages in Worcestershire
Former civil parishes in Worcestershire
Bromsgrove